The Movement is an American reggae band originally formed in Columbia, South Carolina, in 2003. The two founding members, Josh Swain and Jordan Miller, then relocated to Philadelphia, Pennsylvania, where they acquired a live rhythm section in the form of local Philadelphia musicians Jay Schmidt and Gary Jackson. The band has released six studio albums. Their music is commonly described as a fusion of rock, reggae, hip hop and acoustic music.

History

Formation (trio years) and On Your Feet (2003–2007)
The Movement began in 2003 when childhood friends Josh Swain and Jordan Miller reconnected in their hometown of Columbia, South Carolina to write songs as a duo. With Swain on guitar and Miller on congas, the two utilized a drum machine to complete their sound.  Soon after, Jon Ruff, known as "DJ Riggles", joined the group.

In March 2004, they released their first studio album, On Your Feet, which was recorded and mixed at Pat Casey's Modern Music Studios in Columbia, South Carolina. This "alternative reggae" album has proved a mainstay of the reggae/rock genre and is listed at #9 on The Pier's 10 Essential Reggae Rock Albums.

Set Sail and subsequent years (2008–2010)
The band continued to build their following with nonstop touring throughout the United States. They enjoyed success in opening for national acts such as Steel Pulse, Blues Traveler, Slightly Stoopid, The Wailers, Ludacris, G.Love & Special Sauce, Common, Long Beach Shortbus, The Wu Tang Clan, SOJA, and 311.

Swain and Miller relocated to Philadelphia to begin recording what would become their second studio album, 2008's Set Sail at Philadelphonic Studios with producer Chris DiBeneditto, who had worked with G.Love & Special Sauce, Slightly Stoopid and The Expendables. DJ Riggles contributed heavily to the album, but left the band before it was released.

DiBeneditto contacted local drummer Gary Jackson to sit in with Swain and Miller. The three hit it off immediately and Jackson brought in his friend, guitarist Jay Schmidt, to play bass. The release of Set Sail proved to be a turning point in their careers and propelled the band into further nonstop touring. Set Sail had achieved the #7 spot on iTunes' Top 100 Reggae Albums.

Departure of Swain
However, in 2010, Swain left the band while on tour in Arizona. He decided to move to Denver, Colorado with his girlfriend at the time. Miller kept The Movement marching on by touring for two years.

The band added keyboardist John Bowling who was previously in a band with Miller in 2006, called The Executives.

One More Night (2010)
They released their third studio album, One More Night on March 20, 2010. This was the only album featuring Miller as the sole songwriter. It peaked at #1 on the Billboard reggae album chart. Bowling said, three of the songs from One More Night: "When The Feeling Goes Away", "Lonely At The Top" and "Across the Bridge" were songs that were originally written and performed while he and Bowling played together in The Executives.

Departure of Miller
After only one month One More Night was released, Miller told his bandmates he wanted to quit the band he co-founded. He needed to break away for personal reasons and find a relationship to his own health and well-being. He needed to "get home, get healthy, and spend time with his family". So he walked away from the band abruptly just two hours before a scheduled performance at Wofford College in Spartanburg, South Carolina on April 20, 2012. Even though the members were surprised and hurt by Miller's decision, there was no ill will towards him. Miller also wanted a solo career, which was in the works with The Movement's former manager Marshall Lowe.

Reformation with Swain and Side By Side (2012–2014)

Swain's leaving would only be a temporary hiatus, as he returned in 2012 to replace Miller as the lead singer and guitarist.

The reformed trio, with Swain newly at the helm, relocated to San Diego, California, to record their fourth full-length album Side by Side, which was released in August 2013, and entered the Billboard Reggae Albums Chart at #2.

In February 2014, members of the band were arrested for possession of marijuana. Later that year, the band released "Beneath The Palms", a surprise acoustic album on Thanksgiving Day as a gift to their fans.

Golden (2016)
In April 2015, the band released the single, "Rescue" and announced plans to record another full-length album, their fifth LP. The band's fifth album, Golden, was released in April 2016 on Rootfire Cooperative. They collaborated with a John Brown's Body, Matt Goodwin who played keyboards on the album. It topped the Billboard Reggae Albums chart. It reached #1 on iTunes, as well. The album was also voted 2016 Album of the Year by Surf Roots Radio. And later that year, keyboardist Ross Bogan joined the band in the spring to go on tour.

Ways of the World (2019)
The band released their sixth album "Ways of the World" on June 7, 2019. It was produced by musician/reggae music producer John Grey (a.k.a. "Johnny Cosmic"). It features artists Stick Figure, Iya Terra, Jacob Hemphill of SOJA, and Chali 2na of Jurassic 5. Also known as WOTW, the album peaked at #1 on the Billboard charts for Reggae Albums.

The Movement was featured as one of many reggae bands on Collie Buddz riddim album, Cali Roots Riddim 2020 with their single, "Alien", which was produced by Buddz and mixed by Stick Figure's touring guitarist, producer Johnny Cosmic.

In 2021, The Movement was one of several reggae and punk bands on The House That Bradley Built, a charity compilation honoring Sublime's lead singer Bradley Nowell, helping musicians with substance abuse. They covered Sublime's song "Get Out!"

Always With Me (2022)
The Movement recorded their seventh full-length studio album, "Always With Me", which was released on July 29, 2022. It is the band's first self-produced album on their own R4RE Records since their 2004 debut. The album was recorded at White Star Sound, a studio located on a historic farm in the 'backwoods' outside Charlottesville, Virginia. It's also the same studio where they recorded Golden and Ways of the World. Returning to the band is long-time collaborator and former John Brown's Body member Matt Goodwin on keyboard who toured with the band after being a studio mainstay since 2016's Golden. The 15-track record features Clinton Fearon, HIRIE, Iration, Slightly Stoopid, and SOOM T.

Always With Me is also being "considered" for a Grammy Award nomination "Best Reggae Album" at the 65th Grammy Awards in 2023.

Musical style 
Swain and Miller assumed equal roles in leading the band as dual frontmen while showcasing their individual songwriting styles. They are often noted for their use of two-part harmonies while singing backing vocals for one another's songs. Swain talks about the band's music:

Musical influences 
Swain and Miller have cited artists of all genres, ranging from the Pixies to Sublime to Outkast to Norah Jones, as having influenced their own songwriting. In an interview with The Pier, Miller is asked where the reggae influence of their music originated:

Lineup

Current members
Joshua Swain – Lead Vocals, Guitar (2003–2010, 2012–present)
Jason Schmidt – Bass (2008–present)
Gary Jackson – Drums (2008–present)
Matt Goodwin – Keyboard (2019–present)
Kyle Jerome – Saxophone, Percussion (2021-present)

Past members
Jordan Miller – Vocals/Freestyles/Guitar (2003–2012)
Jon Ruff "DJ Riggles" – Turntables (2004–2008)
John Bowling – Keyboard (2010–2012)
Ross Bogan – Keyboard (2016–2019)

Trivia

East Coast Showcase
In December 2006, The Movement, in their original lineup as a trio, beat out 215 other bands in the final round of the annual East Coast Showcase in Rock Hill, SC. They were awarded with over $20,000 in cash and prizes.

Non-Stop Hip-Hop Live
In September 2004, Jordan Miller won the Non-Stop Hip-Hop Live freestyle semifinal at New Brookland Tavern in Columbia, SC.

Band member nicknames
 Josh Swain – "Captain Hook" – in reference to his ability to write strong hooks.
 Jordan Miller – "Jwadi Jwad (the Wordsmither)" – in reference to his hip hop freestyling.
 Jay Schmidt – "Smiles" – in reference to his jovial demeanor.
 Gary Jackson – "Dread" – for his dreadlocks.

Discography

Studio albums

Live/Acoustic albums

Singles

Compilation appearances 
 The Pier Compilation: Volume 1 (2009) – "Care (You Don't Even)"
 Sense Boardwear: Amplified – An Acoustic Collective Vol. 6 (2010) – "Using My Head"
 Music Unites: Reggae Around the World, Vol. 2 (2013) – "Echo"
 General Hydroponics, Vol.2 (2015) – "Rescue"

References

External links 
 
 www.archive.org/details/TheMovement Internet Archive - The Movement's collection of live shows
 www.thepier.org The Pier - "Set Sail album review"
 www.free-times.com Free Times - "Setting Sail" interview

Reggae rock groups
American reggae musical groups
Rock music groups from South Carolina
Rock music groups from Pennsylvania
Musical groups established in 2004
Musical groups from Columbia, South Carolina
Musical groups from Philadelphia
Musical quartets